Nik Cochran (born May 6, 1988) is a Canadian basketball player who also owns a British passport. He played four years for the Davidson Wildcats, and then turned professional. During his first professional season, he played for FIATC Joventut of the Spanish ACB. For the 2014–15 season, Cochran signed with the Dutch champion Donar, though he was cut before the start of the season. He played for UPEA Capo d'Orlando of the Lega Basket Serie A after signing a one-week tryout contract. His contract wasn't renewed.

Cochran has among the all-time NCAA top 25 career free throw percentages (Minimum 300 free throws made and 2.5 free throws made per game) with a 358–401=89.3% (17th according to the 2022–23 NCAA Record book).

References

External links
Profile – Eurobasket.com

1988 births
Living people
British men's basketball players
Canadian expatriate basketball people in the United States
Canadian men's basketball players
Davidson Wildcats men's basketball players
Dutch Basketball League players
Point guards
Basketball players from Vancouver
Basketball people from British Columbia